Al-Agha Group is a production, export supply and marketing company of Turkish origin founded by Mohamed Al-Agha in 2013 affiliated with Al-Agha Company. It was established in Qus, Qena Governorate, Egypt. It includes the Al-Agha Company, founded in 1995, and received the Order of the Rising Sun from the Emperor of Japan.

the date 
Al-Agha Group was established in 2013 by Mohamed Al-Agha. It started its activity in a small store in the old commercial district in the Qus center.

The company quickly had national and international success. The Emperor of Japan awarded it the Order of the Rising Sun in 2022.

Al-Agha Group Factories

Al-Agha Group owns two industrial complexes, one in Qena in the Industrial City and the other in Luxor on an area of ​​​​more than 650 thousand square meters. It includes the Al-Agha Factory Complex, which began production in 1995.

See also 

 List of companies of Egypt
 Economy of Egypt

References 

Qus
Turkish companies established in 1995
Manufacturing companies of Turkey
Manufacturing companies of Egypt